Ramón Eduardo Arellano Félix (August 31, 1964 – February 10, 2002) was a Mexican drug lord who alongside his brothers founded and led the Tijuana Cartel (a.k.a. the Arellano-Félix Organization). He was the leader of the enforcement wing of the organization until his assassination on February 10, 2002.

Biography
Arellano Félix had been linked by Mexican police to the 1998 massacre of twelve members of a family outside of Ensenada, Baja California. The family was related to an alleged associate of the Arellano Félix Cartel.

While in hiding in Los Angeles in 1995, Arellano Félix was unwittingly the subject of a televised prank when he was approached outside Mann's Chinese Theatre in Hollywood by Rupert Jee, who was filming a segment for the Late Show with David Letterman.

On 18 September 1997, Ramon Arellano Félix became the 451st fugitive to be placed on the Ten Most Wanted list. Leading to his Most Wanted Fugitive listing in the United States, he had been charged in a sealed indictment in the United States District Court for the Southern District of California, with Conspiracy to Import Cocaine and Marijuana in drug trafficking.

Kingpin Act sanction 
On 1 June 2000, the United States Department of the Treasury sanctioned Ramón under the Foreign Narcotics Kingpin Designation Act (sometimes referred to simply as the "Kingpin Act"), for his involvement in drug trafficking, along with eleven other international criminals. The act prohibited U.S. citizens and companies from doing any kind of business activity with him, and virtually froze all his assets in the U.S.

Death and aftermath 
On 10 February 2002, Ramón 
Arellano Félix was killed in a gunfight in Bugambilia Street, Mazatlán, Sinaloa, where he was stopped due to a traffic infraction by Mexican police officer, Ángel Antonio Árias Torres. Arellano Félix drew his gun and mortally wounded Árias Torres twice in the chest, who fired back and killed Arellano Félix with a single bullet in the head while falling to the ground and dying. According to Jesús Zambada García (alias "El Rey"), Joaquín "El Chapo" Guzmán ordered Árias Torres to enact the traffic stop and Arellano Félix' execution. 

Arellano's older brother, Benjamín Arellano Félix, the cartel's mastermind, was arrested weeks later on 9 March. On 14 August 2006, the youngest of the Arellano brothers, Francisco Javier Arellano Félix, was arrested with some associates at sea, by the United States Coast Guard. Francisco Javier was extradited to the U.S. on September 16, 2006.

The only brother of the Arellano Félix cartel then at large, Eduardo Arellano Félix, was captured by the Mexican Army on 26 October 2008. At the time, the US State Department had been offering a reward of up to US$5 million for information leading to his arrest. According to a Mexican official, at the time of Eduardo Arellano Félix's capture, control of the cartel passed to Luis Fernando Sánchez Arellano, a son of Eduardo Arellano Félix's sister Alicia. 

At around 16:00 local time on 23 June 2014, Sánchez Arellano was arrested by soldiers of the Mexican Army and federal agents of the Procuraduría General de la República (PGR) at a 
Carl's Jr. fast food restaurant in the Mesa de Otay borough in Tijuana, Baja California, while watching the FIFA World Cup game between Mexico and Croatia. Sánchez Arellano was wearing the Mexico national team jersey and had the team's colors painted on his face. The arrest was made without a single shot fired. The security forces also confiscated US$100,000 he had with him at the moment of his arrest.

In popular culture
In the 2017 Netflix and Univision series, El Chapo, Rolf Petersen plays Ramón Avendaño (a fictionalized portrayal of Ramón Arellano Félix).

Arellano Félix is portrayed by Manuel Masalva in the 2018 crime drama, Narcos: Mexico.

A 2003 Mexican film, "El fin de los Arellano" ("The End of the Arellanos"), featured characters supposedly based on the Arellano brothers; however, its plot bore practically no resemblance to the actual events.

The Arellano brothers were allegedly an inspiration for the two secondary characters of "the Obregón brothers", featured in the 2000 US film Traffic.

Gallery

See also

Illegal drug trade
Mérida Initiative
Mexican Drug War

References

External links
 
 U.S. Department of State rewards page for Ramón Arellano Félix

1964 births
2002 deaths
Fugitives
Fugitives wanted by Mexico
Guadalajara Cartel traffickers
Mexican crime bosses
Mexican drug traffickers
People from Culiacán
People sanctioned under the Foreign Narcotics Kingpin Designation Act
People shot dead by law enforcement officers in Mexico
Tijuana Cartel traffickers